Clayton Walter Holmes (born March 27, 1993) is an American professional baseball pitcher for the New York Yankees of Major League Baseball (MLB). Holmes was drafted by the Pittsburgh Pirates in the ninth round of the 2011 Major League Baseball draft. He made his MLB debut with the Pirates in 2018, and was traded to New York during the 2021 season.

Career

Pittsburgh Pirates
Holmes was drafted by the Pittsburgh Pirates in the ninth round of the 2011 Major League Baseball draft out of Slocomb High School in Slocomb, Alabama. He signed with the Pirates, receiving a $1.2 million signing bonus, forgoing his commitment to play college baseball at Auburn University.

Holmes made his professional debut in 2012 with the State College Spikes and spent the whole season there, going 5–3 with a 2.28 ERA in 13 starts. He spent 2013 with the West Virginia Power where he was 5–6 with a 4.08 ERA in 26 games (25 starts). He underwent Tommy John surgery in 2014 and missed the season. He returned in 2015 and made three rehab starts with the Gulf Coast League Pirates before being assigned to the Bradenton Marauders. In six starts for Bradenton, he struck out 16 batters in 23 innings and compiled a 2.74 ERA. Holmes spent 2016 with the Altoona Curve where he compiled a 10–9 record with a 4.22 ERA in 26 starts.

The Pirates added Holmes to their 40-man roster after the 2016 season. In 2017, he pitched for the Indianapolis Indians where he was 10–5 with a 3.36 ERA in 25 games (24 starts).

Holmes began 2018 with the Indians. Pittsburgh called him up on April 1 as the 26th man for their doubleheader against the Detroit Tigers, but he did not make an appearance and was optioned back to Indianapolis before being recalled once again on April 2. He made his major league debut on April 6 against the Cincinnati Reds, pitching two innings in which he gave up one run on two hits while striking out two and walking none. He was optioned to Indianapolis on April 13.  In 2019 for Pittsburgh, Holmes registered a 5.58 ERA with 10.1 K/9 in 50 innings out of the bullpen.

In 2020 for the Pirates, Holmes only appeared in one game, pitching  scoreless innings against the St. Louis Cardinals in the season opener before being placed on the injured list on July 28 due to a right forearm strain and missing the remainder of the season. On December 2, Holmes was non-tendered by the Pirates. Holmes re-signed with the Pirates on a minor league contract on December 4.

On April 1, 2021, Holmes was selected to the 40-man roster. In 44 appearances for the Pirates, Holmes pitched to a 4.93 ERA with 44 strikeouts in 42 innings.

New York Yankees
On July 26, 2021, the Pirates traded Holmes to the New York Yankees in exchange for Diego Castillo and Hoy Park. He would make his Yankee debut against the Tampa Bay Rays, shutting down the batters in order. He would post a 1.61 ERA, 34 strikeouts and 0.79 WHIP in 28 innings with his new team. Overall, Holmes finished the season with an ERA of 3.60, a WHIP of 1.17 while striking out 78 batters in 70 innings. He was named American League Reliever of the Month in May, allowing no runs in 12 appearances.

Holmes became the team's closer in May 2022, when Aroldis Chapman went on the injured list. Holmes notched his 29th consecutive game without allowing a run on June 18, setting a new Yankees franchise record for consecutive scoreless appearances, breaking Mariano Rivera's record set in 1999. 

For the 2022 season, he was 7-4 with 20 saves and a 2.54 ERA.

References

External links

 

1993 births
Living people
Sportspeople from Dothan, Alabama
Baseball players from Alabama
Major League Baseball pitchers
Pittsburgh Pirates players
New York Yankees players
American League All-Stars
State College Spikes players
West Virginia Power players
Gulf Coast Pirates players
Bradenton Marauders players
Altoona Curve players
Indianapolis Indians players